The 1998 United States Senate elections were held on November 3, with the 34 seats of Class 3 contested in regular elections. This was seen as an even contest between the Republican Party and Democratic Party. While the Democrats had to defend more seats up for election, Republican attacks on the morality of President Bill Clinton failed to connect with voters and anticipated Republican gains did not materialize. The Republicans picked up open seats in Ohio and Kentucky and narrowly defeated Democratic incumbent Carol Moseley Braun (Illinois), but these were cancelled out by the Democrats' gain of an open seat in Indiana and defeats of Republican Senators Al D'Amato (New York) and Lauch Faircloth (North Carolina). The balance of the Senate remained unchanged at 55–45 in favor of the Republicans. With Democrats gaining five seats in the House of Representatives, this marked the first time since 1934 that the party not in control of the White House failed to gain congressional seats in a mid-term election and the first time since 1822 that this party failed to gain seats in the mid-term election of a President's second term. These are the last Senate elections that resulted in no net change in the balance of power. This is the last time Democrats won a U.S. Senate race in South Carolina.

Results summary 

Source: Office of the Clerk

Gains, losses, and holds 

Both Democrats and Republicans gained three seats from the other party, thereby maintaining the same party ratio.

Democratic gains
 Indiana: Former Governor Evan Bayh (D) overwhelmingly defeated Fort Wayne mayor Paul Helmke (R) for the seat of retiring Senator Dan Coats (R), which Bayh's father Birch Bayh (D) once held.
 New York: Three-term Senator Al D'Amato (R) was defeated in "one of 1998's most high-profile and nastiest races" by eight-term Representative Chuck Schumer (D) of the Brooklyn and Queens-based 9th congressional district.
 North Carolina: Trial lawyer John Edwards (D) defeated incumbent Lauch Faircloth (R) in a close race, making Faircloth the fourth incumbent in a row to lose this seat after one term.

Republican gains
 Illinois: Democratic Incumbent Carol Moseley Braun, the first African American woman elected to the Senate, was narrowly defeated by conservative state Senator Peter Fitzgerald. Fitzgerald, though better-funded, maintained a low personal profile while the outspoken Moseley Braun was beset by a series of controversies.
 Kentucky: Representative Jim Bunning (R) narrowly defeated Representative Scotty Baesler (D) for the seat left open by retiring Democratic Senator Wendell H. Ford. Bunning, a former Major League Baseball pitcher, outspent Baesler heavily in increasingly Republican Kentucky.
 Ohio: Governor George Voinovich (R) defeated former Cuyahoga County Commissioner Mary Boyle (D) for the seat of retiring Democratic Senator John Glenn. Voinovich, with an overwhelming advantage in name recognition and funding, maintained a clear lead in the polls in a campaign which turned mostly on his record as governor.

Democratic holds
 Arkansas: Former Representative Blanche Lincoln defeated state Senator Fay Boozman by a comfortable margin to keep the seat of retiring Senator Dale Bumpers in Democratic hands. The race was seen as crucial to the Democratic Party's fortunes in Arkansas.  Two years prior, in the 1996 elections, Republican Tim Hutchinson was elected to the U.S. Senate and Republican Mike Huckabee ascended to the governorship after Democratic Governor Jim Guy Tucker resigned due to Whitewater-related scandals.
 California: Incumbent U.S. Senator Barbara Boxer defeated California State Treasurer Matt Fong after a contentious race. Boxer, a staunch liberal who suffered from low approval ratings, was the most highly targeted Democratic incumbent senator in 1998. Republicans hoped that Fong would appeal to moderates, independents, and his fellow Asian-Americans. Fong pulled ahead of Boxer by early October, but a blitz of negative advertising by Boxer in the final weeks of the campaign that attacked Fong on the issues of abortion and gun control helped boost the incumbent to a 53-43% win.
 Nevada: Democrat Harry Reid defeated three-term Republican Representative John Ensign of the 1st district by just 428 votes to win a third term. Reid was made vulnerable by a Republican trend in Nevada's demographics and the unpopularity of President Bill Clinton in the state. Reid went on to serve as Senate Majority Leader, while Ensign was elected to the Senate in 2000.
 South Carolina: Veteran Democratic Senator Fritz Hollings held back a strong challenge from Republican Congressman Bob Inglis. Inglis later won back his old House seat after his Republican successor Jim DeMint was elected to the Senate after Hollings' retirement in 2004.
 Washington: Incumbent Senator Patty Murray defeated conservative Republican Congresswoman Linda Smith.
 Wisconsin: Incumbent Senator Russ Feingold narrowly defeated Republican U.S. Representative Mark Neumann. Feingold, a leading proponent of campaign finance reform, angered national Democrats by placing self-imposed limits on his campaign spending, but nevertheless spent about $400,000 more on the race than Neumann.

Republican holds
 Colorado: Incumbent Republican Senator Ben Nighthorse Campbell defeated Dottie Lamm, a columnist for The Denver Post and the wife of former Governor Dick Lamm, by a wide margin. It was Campbell's first race as a Republican, as he had been elected to the Senate in 1992 as a Democrat, but switched parties in 1995 after the 1994 Republican takeover of both houses of Congress.
 Georgia: Incumbent Republican Senator Paul Coverdell defeated Michael Coles, the millionaire founder of the Great American Cookie, in a close race.
 Missouri: Incumbent Republican Senator Kit Bond defeated Missouri Attorney General Jay Nixon, who would be elected Governor ten years later.

Change in composition

Before the elections

After the elections

Race summary

Special elections during the 105th Congress 
There were no special elections in 1998.

Elections leading to the next Congress 
In these general elections, the winners were elected for the term beginning January 3, 1999; ordered by state.

All of the elections involved the Class 3 seats.

Closest races 
Eight races had a margin of less than 10%:

California was the tipping point state with a margin of 10.1%.

Alabama 

Incumbent Republican Richard Shelby won re-election to a third term. Shelby had been elected in 1986 and 1992 as a Democrat, but switched to the Republican party in 1994, making this the first election he competed in as a Republican.  He beat Democrat Clayton Suddith, an army veteran and former Franklin County Commissioner.

Alaska 

Incumbent Republican Frank Murkowski easily won re-election to a fourth term against Democratic nominee Joseph Sonneman, a perennial candidate, earning nearly 75% of the vote.

Arizona 

Incumbent Republican John McCain won re-election to a third term over Democratic attorney Ed Ranger.

Arkansas 

Incumbent Dale Bumpers retired. U.S. Representative Blanche Lincoln won the open seat.

California 

Incumbent Democrat Barbara Boxer won re-election to a second term.

Although the race was predicted to be fairly close, Boxer still defeated Fong by a ten-point margin. Boxer as expected did very well in Los Angeles County, and the San Francisco Bay Area.

Colorado 

Incumbent Republican Ben Nighthorse Campbell won re-election to a second term.

Campbell, who was elected in 1992 as a Democrat, switched parties after the 1994 Republican Revolution. He faced a primary challenger, but won with over 70% of the vote. In the general election, Democratic nominee Dottie Lamm criticized Campbell of flip flopping from being a moderate liberal to moderate conservative. In fact, throughout the entire campaign, Lamm mostly sent out negative attack advertisements about Campbell.

Connecticut 

Incumbent Democrat Chris Dodd won re-election for a fourth term against former Republican U.S. Congressman Gary A. Franks.

Florida 

Incumbent Democrat Bob Graham won re-election to a third term.

Graham defeated Crist in a landslide, as Crist won just four counties in the state. There were no third party or independent candidates.

Georgia 

Incumbent Republican Paul Coverdell won re-election to a second term.

Hawaii 

Incumbent Democrat Daniel Inouye won re-election to a seventh term over Republican legislative aide Crystal Young.

Idaho 

Incumbent Republican Dirk Kempthorne decided to retire after one term to run for governor. Republican nominee Mike Crapo won the open seat.

Illinois 

Incumbent Democrat Carol Moseley Braun decided to run for re-election, despite the number of controversies that she had in her first term. Republican State Senator Peter Fitzgerald won his party's primary with a slim margin of victory.

He ended up defeating the incumbent, with a margin of victory of approximately 3%. Peter Fitzgerald won all but five counties.

During Moseley Braun's term as U.S. Senator, she was plagued by several major controversies. Moseley Braun was the subject of a 1993 Federal Elections Commission investigation over $249,000 in unaccounted-for campaign funds. The agency found some small violations, but took no action against Moseley Braun, citing a lack of resources. Moseley Braun only admitted to bookkeeping errors. The Justice Department turned down two requests for investigations from the IRS.

In 1996, Moseley Braun made a private trip to Nigeria, where she met with dictator Sani Abacha. Despite U.S. sanctions against that country, due to Abacha's actions, the Senator did not notify, nor register her trip with, the State Department. She subsequently defended Abacha's human rights records in Congress.

Peter Fitzgerald, a State Senator, won the Republican primary, defeating Illinois Comptroller Loleta Didrickson with 51.8% of the vote, to Didrickson's 48.2%. Fitzgerald spent nearly $7 million in the Republican primary. He had a major financial advantage, as he was a multimillionaire. He ended up spending $12 million in his election victory.

In September, Moseley Braun created controversy again by using the word "nigger" to describe how she claims to be a victim of racism.

Most polls over the first few months showed Moseley Braun trailing badly. However, after she was helped in the final month by notable Democrats such as First Lady Hillary Clinton and U.S. Congressman Luis V. Gutierrez, three polls published in the last week showed her within the margin of error, and, in one poll, running even with Fitzgerald.

Moseley Braun was narrowly defeated by Republican Peter Fitzgerald. Moseley Braun only won four of Illinois's 102 counties. Despite this, the race was kept close by Moseley running up massive margins in Cook County, home of Chicago. However, it wasn't quite enough to win.

Indiana 

Incumbent Republican Dan Coats decided to retire instead of seeking a second full term. Democratic nominee, former Governor Evan Bayh won the open seat his father once held.

Iowa 

Incumbent Republican Chuck Grassley sought re-election to a fourth term in the United States Senate, facing off against former State Representative David Osterberg, who won the Democratic nomination unopposed. Grassley had not faced a competitive election since 1980; this year proved no different, and Grassley crushed Osterberg to win a fourth term.

Kansas 

Incumbent Republican Sam Brownback won re-election to his first full term. Brownback was first elected in a special election held in 1996, when then-Senator Bob Dole resigned to campaign for U.S. President, after 27 years in the Senate. This would've been Dole's seventh term in office had he remained in his seat.

Kentucky 

Incumbent Democratic U.S Senator Wendell Ford decided to retire, instead of seeking a fifth term. Republican Representative Jim Bunning won the open seat.

Louisiana 

Incumbent Democrat John Breaux won re-election to a third term. As of 2022, this is the last time the Democrats have won the Class 3 Senate Seat from Louisiana.

Maryland 

Incumbent Democrat Barbara Mikulski won re-election to a third term.

Missouri 

Incumbent Republican Kit Bond won re-election to a third term.

Nevada 

Incumbent Democrat Harry Reid won re-election to a third term.

Reid won in a close election by 401 votes—even closer than Tim Johnson's Senate run in South Dakota in 2002, when he narrowly defeated Congressman John Thune by 524 votes. Ensign did not contest the results, and Reid won the race.

New Hampshire 

Incumbent Republican Judd Gregg won re-election to his second term.

New York 

Incumbent Republican Al D'Amato was running for re-election to a fourth term, but lost to Chuck Schumer in what was considered by many to be the "high[est] profile and nastiest" contest of the year.

Geraldine Ferraro, former U.S. Representative and nominee for Vice President in 1984, was well known for having been the 1984 Democratic vice presidential nominee and had also run but lost in the Democratic primary in the 1992 U.S. Senate election in New York. Mark Green, New York City Public Advocate, had been the Democratic nominee in the 1986 election, but lost in the general election to D'Amato.

At the start of 1998, Ferraro had done no fundraising, out of fear of conflict of interest with her job hosting the CNN program Crossfire, but was nonetheless perceived as the front-runner by virtue of her name recognition; indeed, December and January polls had her 25 percentage points ahead of Green in the race and even further ahead of Schumer. Unlike her previous campaigns, Ferraro's family finances never became an issue in 1998. However, she lost ground during the summer, with Schumer catching her in the polls by early August and then soon passing her. Schumer, a tireless fundraiser, outspent her by a five-to-one margin, and Ferraro failed to establish a political image current with the times. In the September 15, 1998, primary, she was beaten soundly by Schumer with a 51 percent to 26 percent margin. Unlike the bitter 1992 Democratic senatorial primary, this contest was not divisive, and Ferraro and third-place finisher Green endorsed Schumer at a unity breakfast the following day.

The primaries were held on September 15, 1998.

During the general campaign, D'Amato attempted to brand Schumer as a diehard liberal, while Schumer accused D'Amato of being a liar. When D'Amato's first strategy failed, D'Amato attacked his opponent's attendance record as a member of Congress, which Schumer refuted.

Late in the campaign, D'Amato called Schumer a "putzhead" in a private meeting with Jewish supporters ("putz" is Yiddish for penis, and can be slang for "fool"). The senator later apologized.

In the last days of the campaign, D'Amato campaigned with popular Governor George Pataki, who was also running for re-election, and was also supported by New York City Mayor Rudy Giuliani and former Mayor Ed Koch (a Democrat) Vice President  Al Gore and First Lady Hillary Clinton personally campaigned for Schumer, as D'Amato was a prominent critic of President Bill Clinton who led the investigation into Whitewater. Though the Republican party was well organized, the Democratic party benefited from robocalls from President Clinton and mobilization from two big unions, United Federation of Teachers and 1199.

Though D'Amato was effective in obtaining federal government funds for New York State projects during his Senate career, he failed to capitalize on this in the election. Also, Schumer was a tenacious fund-raiser and was aggressive in his attacks. The candidates spent $30 million during the race.

The race was not close with Schumer defeating the incumbent D'Amato by just over 10%. D'Amato did win a majority of New York's counties, but his wins were in less populated areas. Schumer's win is attributed to strong performance in New York City. Schumer also performed well in heavily populated upstate cities, like Buffalo, Syracuse, Rochester, and Albany.

Per New York State law, Schumer and D'Amato totals include minor party line votes: Independence Party and Liberal Party for Schumer, Right to Life Party for D'Amato.

North Carolina 

Incumbent Republican Lauch Faircloth decided to seek re-election to a second term, but was unseated by Democrat John Edwards.

In the Democratic primary, Edwards defeated D. G. Martin, Ella Scarborough, and several minor candidates. In the Republican primary, Faircloth easily defeated two minor candidates.

North Dakota 

Incumbent NPL–Democrat Byron Dorgan won re-election to a second term.

Republican Donna Nalewaja, State Senator's campaign focused on the suggestion that Dorgan had served in the United States Congress for nearly 20 years, and had accomplished relatively little. Dorgan and Nalewaja won the primary elections for their respective parties. McLain had previously run for North Dakota's other Senate seat in 1980 against Mark Andrews.

Ohio 

Incumbent Democratic U.S Senator John Glenn decided to retire, instead of seeking a fifth term. Republican Governor George Voinovich won the open seat.

Oklahoma 

Incumbent Republican Don Nickles won re-election to his fourth term.

Oregon 

Incumbent Democratic Ron Wyden won re-election to his first full term, defeating Republican nominee John Lim, a state senator.

Pennsylvania 

Incumbent Republican Arlen Specter won re-election to a fourth term.

Leading up to this campaign, the state Democratic Party was in dire straits, as it was plagued by prior corruption allegations of several key legislators and by a lack of fund-raising. Just as in the accompanying gubernatorial race, the party had difficulty in finding a credible candidate. State Representative Bill Lloyd, State Representative, who was a well-respected party leader but who had almost zero statewide name recognition, was considered to be a sacrificial lamb candidate. Specter ran a straightforward campaign and attempted to avoid mistakes, while Lloyd's bid was so underfunded that he was unable to air a single commercial until two weeks before the election. Lloyd's strategy was to portray Republicans as hyper-partisan in wake of their attempt to impeach President Bill Clinton, but he was unable to gain any traction with his message. On Election Day, Specter's win was by the second-largest margin in the history of Senate elections in Pennsylvania. Lloyd won in two counties: almost uniformly Democratic Philadelphia and his home county, rural and typically Republican Somerset County.

South Carolina 

Incumbent Democrat Fritz Hollings won re-election to his sixth full term. As of 2022, this is the last Senate election in South Carolina won by a Democrat.

The race between Hollings and Bob Inglis, U.S. Representative gave the voters a choice of two very different visions of and for South Carolina.  Hollings was from the Lowcountry, a face of the Old New South, and secured a large amount of federal funds for the state.  On the other hand, Inglis came from the Upstate, was a face of the New South, and opposed to pork barrel spending.  Hollings viciously attacked Inglis on the campaign trail as a "goddamn skunk" and when Inglis requested that Hollings sign a pledge for campaign courtesy, Hollings replied that Inglis could "kiss his fanny."  Inglis tried to tie Hollings to President Clinton, who had been tainted by the Lewinsky scandal.

Ultimately, Hollings won the race for four crucial reasons.  First, Inglis refused to accept PAC donations which allowed Hollings to enjoy a huge financial advantage and blanket the state with his television advertisements.  Secondly, Inglis came from the Upstate which already provided GOP majorities whereas Hollings came from the Lowcountry which was a key tossup region in the state.  Thirdly, the voters two years prior in the 1996 Senate election had rewarded Strom Thurmond for his long service to the state and it was unlikely that they would then deny re-election to Hollings.  Finally, the 1998 South Carolina GOP ticket was dragged down with unpopular Governor David Beasley at the top of the ticket who would go on to lose his re-election campaign to Jim Hodges.

South Dakota 

Incumbent Democrat Tom Daschle won re-election to a third term. , this was the last time the Democrats have won the Class 3 Senate Seat from South Dakota.

Utah 

Incumbent Republican Bob Bennett won re-election to a second term.

Vermont 

Incumbent Democrat Patrick Leahy won re-election to a fifth term.

Notably, the Republican nominee, dairy farmer and actor Fred Tuttle, withdrew from the race and endorsed Leahy, asking Vermonters to vote for his Democratic opponent because he hated Washington DC and he was, as his wife had previously said publicly, unqualified to serve as a United States Senator.  His campaign, which had been conducted primarily from his front porch in Tunbridge, VT, spent only $251 during the election season and featured the slogans "Spread Fred!" and "Why Not?"  In spite of this, Tuttle still received 48,051 votes, or 22% of the total.

Washington 

Incumbent Democrat Patty Murray won re-election to a second term.

Wisconsin 

Incumbent Democrat Russ Feingold won re-election to a second term. In September 1997, Mark Neumann, a Republican U.S. Representative, announced his candidacy for the United States Senate against Russell Feingold. Both candidates had similar views on the budget surplus, although Neumann was for banning partial-birth abortion while Feingold was against a ban. Both candidates limited themselves to $3.8 million in campaign spending ($1 for every citizen of Wisconsin), although outside groups spent more than $2 million on Neumann; Feingold refused to have outside groups spend their own 'soft money' on his behalf. Feingold defeated Neumann by a slim 2% margin in the election. According to the Milwaukee Journal-Sentinel, Neumann had a 30,000 vote margin outside Milwaukee County, but was overwhelmed by a 68,000 vote margin in Milwaukee County.

See also 

 1998 United States elections
 1998 United States gubernatorial elections
 1998 United States House of Representatives elections
 105th United States Congress
 106th United States Congress

References

External links 

 JoinCalifornia 1998 General Election
 SmartVoter.org page on the California Senate race.
 1998 North Dakota U.S. Senate Election results